
Gmina Rymań is a rural gmina (administrative district) in Kołobrzeg County, West Pomeranian Voivodeship, in north-western Poland.

Villages
Gmina Rymań contains the villages and settlements of Bębnikąt, Bukowo, Czartkowo, Dębica, Drozdówko, Drozdowo, Gołkowo, Gorawino, Jaglino, Jarkowo, Kamień Rymański, Kinowo, Lędowa, Leszczyn, Leszczyn-Kolonia, Małobór, Mechowo, Mirowo, Petrykozy, Płonino, Rębice, Rymań, Rzesznikówko, Rzesznikowo, Skrzydłowo, Starnin, Starża and Strzeblewo.

Neighbouring gminas
Gmina Rymań is bordered by the gminas of Brojce, Gościno, Płoty, Resko, Siemyśl, Sławoborze and Trzebiatów.

References
Polish official population figures 2006

Ryman
Kołobrzeg County